Tomaz Salomão (born 16 October 1954) is a Mozambican politician and economist. He was Minister of Economy and Finance from 1994 to 2000. 
He served as the third Executive Secretary of the Southern African Development Community (SADC). Salomão was appointed at the 2005 Summit of Heads of State and Government of the Southern African Development Community in Gaborone, Botswana. He earned his doctorate at Johns Hopkins University in Baltimore, Maryland, United States.

Opponents of President Robert Mugabe of Zimbabwe have criticized Salomão for his assessment of Zimbabwean elections as free and fair. Salomão said that SADC would pull out an EU summit to be held in Lisbon in December 2007 if Zimbabwe was on the agenda. "SADC will not go to Lisbon to discuss Zimbabwe because the summit is not about Zimbabwe, but about relations between the EU and Africa," he said.

References

1954 births
Living people
Mozambican politicians
Finance ministers of Mozambique
Johns Hopkins University alumni
Mozambican economists
Southern African Development Community people
Mozambican diplomats
FRELIMO politicians